Geoffry Bertram Smith (28 June 1889 - 23 July 1957) was an Anglican priest, most notably Archdeacon of Surrey from 1955 until his death.

Ritchie was educated at Blundell's School. He entered Britannia Royal Naval College in 1904; and retired with the rank of Captain. He trained for the priesthood at Westcott House, Cambridge and began his ecclesiastical career with a curacy at Headley, Hampshire. He was a Chaplain in the RNVR during World War II.  He was Vicar of Tilford, Surrey from 1945 to 1955; and Rural Dean of Farnham, Surrey from 1954 to 1955.

References

1957 deaths
1889 births
Royal Naval Volunteer Reserve personnel of World War II
Royal Navy officers
Graduates of Britannia Royal Naval College
Alumni of Westcott House, Cambridge
Archdeacons of Surrey
People educated at Blundell's School